Stanley John Forrest (1904–1977) was a Church of England priest and popular poet. He was a friend and collaborator of John Betjeman. Forrest was vicar of St John's Church, Watford from 1954 to 1961.

Works 
The Church in Reconstruction (1945)
Anglican Noah's Ark (1947)
Buzzards at Play (1947)
What the Vicar Likes (1952)
Time for a Rhyme (1954)
What's the Use? (1955)
Chapter and Verse (1959)
A Town Parson's Day (1960)
Orders in Orbit (1962)
Our Man at St. Withit's (1964)
Verse from the Vestry (1966)
Parson's Play-pen (1968)
Saints and Sinods (1971)
The Church Bizarre: Light Verse for Heavy Weather (1973)

References 
An Affectionate Portrait
The Anglican Poetry of S.J. Forrest, by Richard J. Mammana

External links 
Bibliographic directory from Project Canterbury

1904 births
1977 deaths
Anglican poets